Neil Best is a sports media journalist for Newsday. Best has worked at Newsday for over 30 years and currently publishes the column SportsWatch.

Early life
Best moved from Hillside, New Jersey to East Northport, New York at age 11. He came of age on Long Island, where he would establish his career.

In high school, Best was a journalist for The Rag at Northport High School. Best went on to attend college at Cornell University and wrote for The Cornell Daily Sun until his graduation in 1982.

Career
After his graduation from Cornell, Best began his career at Newsday in 1982. However, he left for a few years to work at The Anchorage Times. He returned to Newsday in 1985 and has remained at the paper since.

Throughout his career at Newsday, Best has covered a variety of sports topics. He began writing about St. John's Red Storm men's basketball and went on to do beat reporting about the New York Giants. He has periodically appeared on the television show Giants Online, hosted by Bob Papa and Pat Hanlon. In 2005, he began his current sports media and business column, SportsWatch.

In 2007, Best began his online sports blog, WatchDog, which quickly became popular. When Cablevision acquired Newsday a few years later, readers had to start paying a monthly subscription fee to read WatchDog, causing Best to bid his readers farewell.

As Best continues to write for Newsday, he has maintained a presence in various media platforms, evaluating everything from sports radio shows to the Super Bowl. He has two daughters.

References

Year of birth missing (living people)
Living people